District 22 is a constituency in the Parliament of Chile. It elects 5 members

Members 

2018 to 2022
 Andrea Parra - New Majority

References 

Constituencies of Chile